Dasychira thwaitesi is a moth of the family Erebidae first described by Frederic Moore in 1883. It is found in India and Sri Lanka.

The caterpillar is a minor pest on Camellia sinensis. Caterpillars are primary hosts for many parasitoid wasps such as Brachymeria euploeae and Brachymeria lasus.

References

Moths of Asia
Moths described in 1865